Luge at the 1992 Winter Olympics consisted of three events at La Plagne.  The competition took place between 9 and 12 February 1992.

Medal summary

Medal table

Germany led the medal table with four medals, including two gold.

Events

Participating NOCs
Twenty-three nations participated in Luge at the Albertville Games. Australia, Bermuda, Latvia and the Unified Team made their Olympic luge debuts.

References

 
1992
1992 Winter Olympics events
1992 in luge